Benoît Sokal (28 June 1954 – 28 May 2021) was a Belgian comic artist and video game developer, best known for his comics series Inspector Canardo, and the Syberia adventure game franchise.

Biography
Benoît Sokal was born in Brussels in 1954. According to him, his grandfather was an Austrian General of the cavalry of Ukrainian Jewish origin who had to fled for Belgium in 1939 with the help of a German officer he knew since 1914, crossing all Eastern Europe while surviving the Nazis. Sokal studied at the École Supérieure des Arts Saint-Luc in Brussels, together with many contemporary Belgian comic artists like François Schuiten. He began drawing for À Suivre magazine in 1978. He created the Inspector Canardo series, featuring a depressed anthropomorphic duck detective with a penchant for cigarettes, alcohol and femmes fatales, before working on other titles.

In 1983 he moved to Reims, France. Later he joined the software developer Microïds and designed the adventure games Amerzone, Syberia and Syberia II (published by Microïds, the adventure game label of Anuman Interactive). He then founded his own game company, White Birds Productions, where he created the adventure game Paradise published through Ubisoft.

He died on 28 May 2021 after a battle with long-term illness.

Bibliography

 Inspector Canardo, 23 albums, 1981- ; Casterman
 Sanguine, with Alain Populaire; 1988, Casterman
 Le Vieil Homme qui n'Écrivait Plus, 1996; Casterman
 Syberia, 1 album, 2002; Casterman (sketches and drawings for the game Syberia)
 Paradise, 2 albums, 2005-, artist Brice Bingono; Casterman

Video games
 Amerzone (1999)
 Syberia (2002)
 Syberia II (2004)
 Paradise (2006)
 Last King of Africa (2008) (Nintendo DS version of Paradise)
 Sinking Island (2007)
 Aquarica (2008) (canceled)
 Syberia 3 (2017)
 Syberia: The World Before (2022, posthumous)

Awards
 1999: Prix Pixel-INA (category "Games") at the Imagina 99 festival, Monaco
 2002: GameSpy PC Adventure Game of the Year
 2003: nominated for the Award for Best Dialogue at the Angoulême International Comics Festival, France

References

External links

Sokal publications in (A SUIVRE) BDoubliées 
Sokal albums Bedetheque 
Benoît Sokal biography on Lambiek Comiclopedia

1954 births
2021 deaths
Artists from Brussels
Belgian comics writers
Belgian comics artists
Belgian humorists
Belgian satirists
French people of Ukrainian-Jewish descent
Syberia